Die sechs Siebeng'scheiten was a German television series first broadcast by the ARD in 1957. It was a quiz show that had students of different schools competing against each other, one episode typically lasting 30 minutes. The program was discontinued in 1996. Until then, around 400 episodes had aired. Among others, the show was moderated by Elmar Hörig.

See also
List of German television series

1957 German television series debuts
1996 German television series endings
1950s German television series
1960s German television series
1970s German television series
1980s German television series
German-language television shows
Das Erste original programming